The 2013 Tour of Flanders for Women was the tenth edition of the Tour of Flanders for Women single-day cycling race in Belgium and was the third race of the 2013 UCI Women's Road World Cup season.

Results

Source

World Cup standings

Standings after 3 of 8 2013 UCI Women's Road World Cup races.

Individuals

Source

Teams

Source

References

External links

Tour of Flanders for Women
Tour of Flanders W
Tour of Flanders